Jochen Pietzsch (born 1 December 1963 in Halle, Saxony-Anhalt) is an East German luger who competed during the mid-1980s. Together with Jörg Hoffmann, he won two medals in the men's doubles event with a gold in 1988 and a bronze in 1984.

Pietzsch also found great success at the FIL World Luge Championships with a total of six medals, including four gold (Men's doubles: 1983, 1985, 1987; Mixed team: 1990) and two bronzes (Men's doubles: 1989, 1990). He also won three medals at the FIL European Luge Championships with two golds (Men's doubles and mixed team: both 1990) and one silver (Men's doubles: 1986).

Pietzsch won the overall Luge World Cup title in men's doubles in 1983–84. He married cross-country skier Kerstin Mohring.

References

External links

1963 births
Living people
Sportspeople from Halle (Saale)
German male lugers
Lugers at the 1984 Winter Olympics
Lugers at the 1988 Winter Olympics
Olympic gold medalists for East Germany
Olympic bronze medalists for East Germany
Olympic medalists in luge
National People's Army military athletes
Medalists at the 1984 Winter Olympics
Medalists at the 1988 Winter Olympics
20th-century German people